Michel Schaller (born 28 June 1969) is a retired French para table tennis player who competed in international level events. He stopped competing in international events and played in national competitions until he finally retired in 2014. He won multiple medals in team events along with Stéphane Messi, Alain Pichon and Julien Soyer.

References

1969 births
Living people
Sportspeople from Moselle (department)
Paralympic table tennis players of France
Table tennis players at the 2000 Summer Paralympics
Table tennis players at the 2004 Summer Paralympics
Medalists at the 2000 Summer Paralympics
Medalists at the 2004 Summer Paralympics
Paralympic medalists in table tennis
Paralympic silver medalists for France
French male table tennis players
21st-century French people
20th-century French people